World Bet Exchange (WBX) was a person-to-person betting exchange based in Notting Hill Gate, London in the United Kingdom, and licensed and regulated by the UK Gambling Commission. WBX.com was founded in 2002 by Malcolm Gray but did not officially launch until November, 25th, 2006. In an interview prior to launch, Gray was quoted as saying: "In an industry where the current market leader has a virtual monopoly, we believe the arrival of WBX will put every exchange player back in control. We will continually seek to offer a vibrant, exciting and innovative alternative to Betfair, and we hope this will promote healthy rivalry."
On 16 March 2015 the company announced that it was shutting, effective 5pm the same day.

Company Structure
World Bet Exchange Limited and WBX Members Funds Limited were wholly owned subsidiaries of WBX Holdings Plc. All three companies were registered in England and Wales. WBX Members Funds Limited, which didn't otherwise trade, was a company that was established in order to safeguard members’ funds in a separate bank account. The funds were held subject to a trust deed and quarterly, external audits, which were published on the WBX website. The company's structure rendered improper use of members' funds illegal, which apparently was not the case in the Sporting Options incident.

Racing Sponsorship 
Prior to the launch of WBX.com, the company was already the fourth largest sponsor of horse races in Britain, having spent more than £250,000 on over 200 race sponsorships. Coinciding with the November 2006 launch, WBX founded the Triple Crown of Hurdling to complement their sponsorship of the Newcastle Fighting Fifth Hurdle at Kempton Park Racecourse. When asked about the Triple Crown, Malcolm Gray was quoted as saying: "The WBX Hurdling Triple Crown will bind together ... three races (Fighting Fifth Hurdle, Christmas Hurdle and Champion Hurdle) to form a championship series which will finally offer horse racing fans a true measure of the greatest hurdlers in National Hunt racing." If any horse wins all three legs in a given season, a £1 million bonus will be awarded and divided amongst connections of the horse, making the Triple Crown the richest ever prize over small obstacles.

Industry Status 
Like other rivals to Betfair, WBX attempted to secure new customers by charging less commission on winning bets. According to the findings of their own unpublished study, the company claimed that its members would have paid 35% more commission had they done their betting at Betfair. WBX also moved to capitalise on Betfair's September 2008 decision to impose a Premium Charge on winning bettors. WBX claimed that its members wagered over £500 million against one another in 2008, and in excess of £1 billion since its inception in 2006.

Notes

External links

Gambling companies established in 2002
Gambling companies disestablished in 2015
Defunct gambling companies
2002 establishments in England
2015 disestablishments in England